The 1978–79 NCAA Division II men's ice hockey season began in November 1978 and concluded on March 17 of the following year. This was the 15th season of second-tier college ice hockey.

Regular season

Season tournaments

Standings

1979 NCAA tournament

Note: * denotes overtime period(s)

See also
 1978–79 NCAA Division I men's ice hockey season
 1978–79 NCAA Division III men's ice hockey season

References

External links

 
NCAA